The 9th constituency of the Nord is a French legislative constituency in the Nord département.

Description

Nord's 9th constituency includes the north east of Lille and the south of Tourcoing as well as the suburb of Marcq-en-Barœul, which lies between the two. The canton of Lille Nord-Est was only added in the 2010 redistricting of French legislative constituencies.

Politically the seat was entirely consistent in its support until 2017 of the Gaullist right since the inception of the 5th Republic.

Historic Representation

Election results

2022

 
 
 
 
 
 
 
 
|-
| colspan="8" bgcolor="#E9E9E9"|
|-

2017

2012

 
 
 
 
 
|-
| colspan="8" bgcolor="#E9E9E9"|
|-

2007

 
 
 
 
 
 
|-
| colspan="8" bgcolor="#E9E9E9"|
|-

2002

 
 
 
 
|-
| colspan="8" bgcolor="#E9E9E9"|
|-

1997

 
 
 
 
 
 
 
|-
| colspan="8" bgcolor="#E9E9E9"|
|-
 
 

 
 
 
 
 

* UDF dissident

Sources
 Official results of French elections from 1998: 

9